|}

The Superior Mile is a Group 3 flat horse race in Great Britain open to horses aged three years or older. It is run over a distance of 1 mile and 37 yards (1,643 metres) at Haydock Park in early September.

History
The event was established in 2003, and it originally held Listed status. The first running was won by Gateman. It was promoted to Group 3 level in 2013.

The Superior Mile is currently staged on the final day of Haydock Park's three-day Sprint Cup Festival. It is run on the same day as the Sprint Cup and is sponsored by the online gaming company Unibet. From 2016 to 2018 the race was run under sponsored titles.

Records
Most successful horse:
 no horse has won this race more than once

Leading jockey (2 wins):
 Richard Kingscote – Ballet Concerto (2017), Great Scot (2019)
 Andrea Atzeni -  Artistic Rifles (2021), Triple Time (2022) 

Leading trainer (3 wins):
 Roger Charlton – Cityscape (2010), Thistle Bird (2012), Captain Cat (2014)
 Sir Michael Stoute – Linngari (2005), Confront (2009), Ballet Concerto (2017)

Winners

See also
 Horse racing in Great Britain
 List of British flat horse races

References

 Racing Post:
 

 horseracingintfed.com – International Federation of Horseracing Authorities – Superior Mile Stakes (2018).
 pedigreequery.com – Superior Mile – Haydock.

Open mile category horse races
Haydock Park Racecourse
Flat races in Great Britain
2003 establishments in England
Recurring sporting events established in 2003